The 2002 Houston Bowl was the third edition of the college football bowl game (known in its first two years as the "Galleryfurniture.com Bowl") and was played at Reliant Stadium in Houston, Texas. The game pitted the Oklahoma State Cowboys from the Big 12 Conference and the Southern Miss Golden Eagles from Conference USA (C-USA). The game was the final competition of the 2002 football season for each team and resulted in a 33–23 Oklahoma State victory.

Scoring summary
First quarter
Oklahoma State Josh Fields 3 yard touchdown pass to Mike Denard. 7–0 Oklahoma State
Oklahoma State Luke Phillips 46 yard field goal. 10–0 Oklahoma State
Southern Miss Curt Jones 38 yard field goal. 10–3 Oklahoma State

Second quarter
Southern Miss Dustin Almond 13 yard touchdown run. 10–10 Tie
Oklahoma State Luke Phillips 52 yard field goal. 13–10 Oklahoma State
Southern Miss Curt Jones 24 yard field goal. 13–13 Tie
Oklahoma State Josh Fields 51 yard touchdown pass to Rashaun Woods. 20–13 Oklahoma State

Third quarter
Southern Miss James Walley 2 yard touchdown run. 20–20 Tie
Southern Miss Curt Jones 30 yard field goal. 23–20 Southern Miss

Fourth quarter
Oklahoma State Luke Phillips 28 yard field goal. 23–23 Tie
Oklahoma State Tatum Bell 22 yard touchdown run. 30–23 Oklahoma State
Oklahoma State Luke Phillips 24 yard field goal. 33–23 Oklahoma State

References

Houston Bowl
Houston Bowl
Oklahoma State Cowboys football bowl games
Southern Miss Golden Eagles football bowl games
December 2002 sports events in the United States
Houston Bowl
2002 in Houston